The 1929 Tour de France was the 23rd edition of Tour de France, one of cycling's Grand Tours. The Tour began in Paris with a flat stage on 30 June, and Stage 11 occurred on 13 July with a flat stage to Marseille. The race finished in Paris on 28 July.

Stage 1
30 June 1929 — Paris to Caen,

Stage 2
1 July 1929 — Caen to Cherbourg-en-Cotentin,

Stage 3
2 July 1929 — Cherbourg-en-Cotentin to Dinan,

Stage 4
3 July 1929 — Dinan to Brest,

Stage 5
4 July 1929 — Brest to Vannes,

Stage 6
5 July 1929 — Vannes to Les Sables d'Olonne,

Stage 7
6 July 1929 — Les Sables d'Olonne to Bordeaux,

Stage 8
7 July 1929 — Bordeaux to Bayonne,

Stage 9
9 July 1929 — Bayonne to Luchon,

Stage 10
10 July 1929 — Luchon to Perpignan,

Stage 11
13 July 1929 — Perpignan to Marseille,

References

1929 Tour de France
Tour de France stages